Radosław Gilewicz (born 8 May 1971) is a Polish former professional footballer who played as a midfielder or as a striker.

Club career
Born in Chełm Śląski, Gilewicz started his career in 1991 playing for GKS Tychy. In 1992, he transferred to Ruch Chorzów.

From 1993 to 1995 Gilewicz played for FC St. Gallen. He later moved to VfB Stuttgart where he stayed for two years before once again moving to Karlsruher SC. He played his final game for Karlsruhe in the final of DFB-Pokal, a game he entered late on as a substitute.

He then moved to Austria in 1999 where he played for FC Tirol Innsbruck. In the 2000–01 season, he scored 22 goals for the Tyroleans and was the league's top scorer. He stayed at the club until it went into liquidation. From 2002 until 2005 he was with Austria Wien. Next he played for FC Superfund. He has won the Austrian title four times and has won the Austrian Cup twice and is the Polish all-time top goalscorer in Austrian football.

He played for Polonia Warsaw before retiring in summer 2008.

Personal life
He is married and has two children (Konrad and Jasmina). Konrad Gilewicz is also a footballer and plays for FC Wacker Innsbruck reserve team.

References

External links
 
 Radoslaw Gilewicz at fussballportal.de 

1971 births
Living people
People from Bieruń-Lędziny County
Sportspeople from Silesian Voivodeship
Association football midfielders
Association football forwards
Polish footballers
Poland international footballers
Polish expatriate footballers
Ruch Chorzów players
FC St. Gallen players
VfB Stuttgart players
Karlsruher SC players
FC Tirol Innsbruck players
FK Austria Wien players
Polonia Warsaw players
Swiss Super League players
Bundesliga players
2. Bundesliga players
Austrian Football Bundesliga players
Expatriate footballers in Switzerland
Expatriate footballers in Germany
Expatriate footballers in Austria
Polonia Warsaw managers
Polish football managers
Polish expatriate sportspeople in Germany
Polish expatriate sportspeople in Austria
Polish expatriate sportspeople in Switzerland